Holly Bass is a Washington DC-based performance artist, poet, dancer, arts educator and cultural activist.

Education 
Bass studied modern dance (under Viola Farber) and also creative writing at Sarah Lawrence College (Class of 1993, where she was the commencement speaker). She also has a Master’s degree in Journalism from Columbia University (1994).

Work 
Her movement and spoken-word pieces reveal a fascination with "objectification, observation, and the commodification of art and of the body." Holly has performed across the US and internationally. She is a Cave Canem Foundation fellow and her poems, essays and articles have been published in numerous publications including the Wall Street Journal, The Washington Post, Callaloo and Beltway Poetry; and in 1999 she was the first person to use the term “Hip-Hop Theater” in print.

Her artworks include the installation Black Space at Martin Luther King Jr. Memorial Library, Washington DC, which comprises a small house placed on an outline of the city, alluding to the tiny house architectural movement and the housing problems in DC.

She wrote and performed the one-person dance piece Diary of a Baby Diva in Washington DC in 2005, a coming-of-age tale set in the late 1970s and early 1980s. The Washington Post noted her "wicked sense of humor" in making use of the more ridiculous cultural products of the age, but also a lyrical quality revealing her as an "eloquent poet".

Bass was voted Washington City Paper’s Best Performance Artist of 2012.

In 2018 she wrote and performed The Trans-Atlantic Time Traveling Company, which is "about a sisterhood of three women who time-travel from the present to the 1860s when they become freedwomen, in quest of what it means to be free."

More recently, in 2020, she wrote and performed Moneymaker at  New York Live Arts in New York City. The piece has been described as "part political commentary and part celebration of social dance, Moneymaker interweaves a lineage of Black artistry with a satirical critique of the history of exploitation, commodification, and objectification of Black women." American Woman, a day-long durational performance and digital video with sound, was selected for the 2022 Outwin Boochever Portrait Competition at the National Portrait Gallery.

References

External links
Holly Bass Website
Holly Bass Poetry Ephemera Collection, George Washington University

People from Washington, D.C.
1975 births
Living people
Artists from Washington, D.C.
African-American women artists
American performance artists
African-American poets
American women poets
Columbia University Graduate School of Journalism alumni
Sarah Lawrence College alumni
African-American women musicians
21st-century African-American people
21st-century African-American women
20th-century African-American people
20th-century African-American women
African-American women writers